Glechoma is a genus of flowering plants in the mint family, Lamiaceae, first described for modern science in 1753. It is distributed in northern Asia and Europe with a center of diversity in Asia, especially China. One species is naturalized in New Zealand and in North America.

These plants are perennial herbs with stolons. The stems are prostrate or upright and bear leaf blades on long petioles. The inflorescences arising from the leaf axils have two to many flowers. The tubular corolla has two lobed lips, and is generally blue-violet. The genus is closely related to Marmoritis but closer still to Meehania, and some species have in the past been moved between the latter genus and Glechoma.

Species
 Glechoma biondiana (Diels) C.Y.Wu & C.Chen - Gansu, Hebei, Henan, Hubei, Shaanxi, Sichuan
 Glechoma grandis (A.Gray) Kuprianova - Japan, Taiwan, Jiangsu
 Glechoma hederacea L. – ground-ivy, creeping charlie - much of Europe, much of Russia, Central Asia, Xinjiang; naturalized in New Zealand and North America
 Glechoma hirsuta Waldst. & Kit. - eastern and southeastern Europe
 Glechoma longituba (Nakai) Kuprian. - Vietnam, Korea, eastern + central China, Russian Far East (Amur, Primorye)
 Glechoma × pannonica Borbás - eastern Russia, Ukraine, Hungary, Baltic Republics   (G. hederacea × G. hirsuta)
 Glechoma sardoa Halácsy & Wettst. - Sardinia
 Glechoma sinograndis C.Y.Wu - Yunnan

Etymology
Glechoma is said to derive from the Greek name glechon for pennyroyal,  Mentha pulegium.

Ecology
Insects found on Glechoma include the carpenter bee Xylocopa sinensis, which robs nectar from G. longituba.

References

External links
Flora Europaea: Glechoma

Lamiaceae
Lamiaceae genera
Taxa named by Carl Linnaeus